University for the Arts, Sciences, and Communication (UNIACC) is a Chilean university located in Providencia, Chile. It is a nonprofit institution owned by the Apollo Group. In 2019, Apollo University network reorganized its focus strategically on some countries in the regions where it operates; therefore, ceasing its operations in Chile. That makes it clear that the University's controllers have always worked in strict adherence to the letter of the Chilean Law on Higher Education, but now going further in compliance to the "spirit of the Law" as its controllers are non-profit entities. Today, UNIACC is controlled by three different nonprofit organizations: Corporación Educacional Veritas, Corporación Educacional San Félix, and Corporación Educacional Aura.

Careers 
Some of the most attractive careers for students are:

 Advertising
 Audiovisual Communication (Television)
 Audiovisual Communication (Screenwriting)
 Audiovisual Communication (Cinema)
 Graphic design
 Dance
 Public Relations
 Journalism
 Music and Composition
 Social Work

Events 
Winter and summer workshop for high school students are one of the most popular events hosted by UNIACC.

Beca Talento Joven (BTJ) is an admisión event, hosted by UNIACC, in which participant can apply for their career and obtain a generous scholarship.

Facilities 

 TV studios
 Post production labs
 English labs

External links 
 UNIACC website

Universities in Chile
Universities in Santiago Metropolitan Region
Apollo Education Group